Didrik Ferdinand Didrichsen (3 July 1814 in Copenhagen – 19 March 1887 in Frederiksberg) was a Danish botanist and physicist.

He participated as botanist in the first Galathea Expedition (1845—1847). In 1851 he began work as a librarian at the botanical gardens in Copenhagen. From 1856 to 1875 he was an associate professor of botany. In 1875, Didrichsen succeeded Anders Sandøe Ørsted as professor of botany at the University of Copenhagen and director of the botanic garden, whereby the already then much better known Eugen Warming was passed over. After Didrichsen's retirement in 1885, Warming succeeded him in both positions.

As a taxonomist, he described the botanical genera Mostuea, Myriogomphus, Pogonophyllum and Stenonia, as well as numerous plant species. Many of these findings were published in the  Videnskabelige Meddelelser fra den Naturhistoriske Forening i Kjøbenhavn. Taxa with the specific epithet of didrichsenii are named in his honor.

Publications 
 Plantas nonnullas musei Universitatis Hauniensis descripsit, 1854.
 For hundrede Aar siden : smaa Samlinger til et Tidsrum af den danske Botaniks Historie : særskilt Aftryk af "Naturhistorisk Tidsskrift", 3. R. 6. B., 1869.

References 

1814 births
1887 deaths
19th-century Danish botanists
Botanists active in South Asia
University of Copenhagen alumni
Academic staff of the University of Copenhagen